The men's freestyle heavyweight competition at the 1960 Summer Olympics in Rome took place from 1 to 6 September at the Basilica of Maxentius. Nations were limited to one competitor.

Competition format

This freestyle wrestling competition continued to use the "bad points" elimination system introduced at the 1928 Summer Olympics for Greco-Roman and at the 1932 Summer Olympics for freestyle wrestling, though adjusted the point values slightly. Wins by fall continued to be worth 0 points and wins by decision continued to be worth 1 point. Losses by fall, however, were now worth 4 points (up from 3). Losses by decision were worth 3 points (consistent with most prior years, though in some losses by split decision had been worth only 2 points). Ties were now allowed, worth 2 points for each wrestler. The elimination threshold was also increased from 5 points to 6 points. The medal round concept, used in 1952 and 1956 requiring a round-robin amongst the medalists even if one or more finished a round with enough points for elimination, was used only if exactly three wrestlers remained after a round—if two competitors remained, they faced off head-to-head; if only one, he was the gold medalist.

Results

Round 1

 Bouts

 Points

Round 2

 Bouts

 Points

Round 3

 Bouts

 Points

Round 4

 Bouts

 Points

Round 5

 Bouts

 Points

Round 6

With three wrestlers left, the remaining men used a round-robin to determine medals rather than giving one competitor a bye in round 6. Kaplan and Dzarasov had tied in round 5. Dietrich defeated Dzarasov then tied Kaplan, finishing with the best record against the other medalists to take the gold medal. Kaplan's two ties gave him the silver medal, while Dzarasov's loss and tie earned bronze.

 Bouts

 Points

References

Wrestling at the 1960 Summer Olympics